The 1971 John Player League was the third competing of what was generally known as the Sunday League.  The competition was won for the first time by Worcestershire County Cricket Club.

Standings

Batting averages

Bowling averages

See also
 Sunday League

References

John Player League
Pro40